Carl Davenport (born 30 May 1944) is an English former footballer who played as a centre forward in the Football League for Stockport County. He played non-league football in England before enjoying a successful career in the League of Ireland. He also appeared on Love in the countryside.

Life and career
Born in Farnworth, which was then in Lancashire, Davenport was on the books of Bolton Wanderers and Preston North End, without making a league appearance for either, before joining Stockport. He then played for Cheshire League clubs Wigan Athletic and Macclesfield Town.

He then moved to Ireland, where at the age of 23 he became player-manager of Cork Celtic, was the League of Ireland's joint top scorer in 1967–68, went on to play for Cork Hibernians, Limerick and St Patrick's Athletic, and was capped twice for the League of Ireland Representative XI. In 2003, Bolton Wanderers played a Cork All Stars XI in Davenport's testimonial match.

References

1944 births
Living people
People from Farnworth
English footballers
Association football forwards
Bolton Wanderers F.C. players
Preston North End F.C. players
Stockport County F.C. players
Wigan Athletic F.C. players
Macclesfield Town F.C. players
Cork Celtic F.C. players
Cork Hibernians F.C. players
Limerick F.C. players
St Patrick's Athletic F.C. players
English Football League players
League of Ireland players